Portland is an unincorporated community located partially in the town of Portland in Dodge County, Wisconsin and partially in the town of Waterloo in Jefferson County, Wisconsin, United States.

Notes

Unincorporated communities in Dodge County, Wisconsin
Unincorporated communities in Jefferson County, Wisconsin
Unincorporated communities in Wisconsin